Aarne Ermus (born on 14 April 1966) is an Estonian military officer.

Biography

Early life and service in the Soviet Army 
Aarne Ermus was born on 14 April 1966 in Abja-Paluoja. He graduated Karksi-Nuia Middle School in 1984 and continued his studies in Omsk at the Higher Command Military School. After graduating from the Omsk Military School, Aarne Ermus was first the commander of a motorized rifle group of the Soviet Army in the Far East.

Estonian Defence Force 
In connection with the independence of Estonia, Ermus joined the EDF. From 1992 to 1996, he was associated with the Kuperjanov Infantry Battalion.

He has been Chief of Staff of the General Staff of the Estonian Defence Forces, also as the Operative Commander of the Estonian Defence Forces. He has been Estonia's permanent military representative at NATO headquarters with the Allied Powers Europe. He has also been Defence Attaché to Latvia and Lithuania.
In 2007 he became the Commandand of the Estonian National Defence College, and in 2013 he became a lecturer.

References

Living people
1966 births
Estonian military personnel
20th-century Estonian military personnel
21st-century Estonian military personnel
Recipients of the Military Order of the Cross of the Eagle, Class IV
People from Abja-Paluoja